Dolata is a surname. It may refer to:

 Katarzyna Skowrońska-Dolata (born 1983), Polish volleyball player
 Ulrich Dolata (born 1959), German sociologist
 Zbigniew Dolata (born 1965), Polish politician

See also
 

Polish-language surnames